Georges N'Doum (born 31 July 1985) is a Cameroonian former professional footballer who played as a defender for TuS 64 Bösinghoven. His preferred position is left back.

References

External links
 

1985 births
Living people
Cameroonian footballers
Cameroon international footballers
Association football defenders
U.S. Vibonese Calcio players
AC Horsens players
KFC Uerdingen 05 players
MSV Duisburg players
MSV Duisburg II players
Borussia Mönchengladbach II players
Danish Superliga players
Bundesliga players
Association football utility players
Expatriate men's footballers in Denmark
Expatriate footballers in Germany
Expatriate footballers in Italy
Cameroonian expatriates in Denmark
Cameroonian expatriates in Germany
Cameroonian expatriates in Italy